The Kaiyuan–Hekou Expressway, commonly referred to as the Kaihe Expressway is an expressway that connects Kaiyuan, Honghe Hani and Yi Autonomous Prefecture, Yunnan, China and Hekou Yao Autonomous County, Honghe Hani and Yi Autonomous Prefecture, Yunnan. It is a spur of G80 Guangzhou–Kunming Expressway and is entirely in Yunnan Province.

It was fully complete by 2018.

Hekou, the southern terminus of the expressway, is located on the China–Vietnam border and there is a border crossing available to Lào Cai, Vietnam, where the  Hanoi-Lao Cai Expressway starts.

References

Chinese national-level expressways
Expressways in Yunnan